Jean-François Briand (born March 1, 1965 in Angers) is a French sprint canoer.

Career
Briand competed in the early 1990s. He was eliminated in the semifinals of the K-4 1000 m event at the 1992 Summer Olympics in Barcelona.

References
 Sports-Reference.com profile

1965 births
Canoeists at the 1992 Summer Olympics
French male canoeists
Living people
Olympic canoeists of France
Sportspeople from Angers